This is a list of African-American newspapers that have been published in Texas.  It includes both current and historical newspapers.  The history of such newspapers in Texas begins shortly after the Civil War, with the publication of The Free Man's Press in 1868. 

Many African American newspapers are published in Texas today, including three in Houston alone.  These current newspapers are highlighted in green in the list below.

Newspapers

See also 
List of African-American newspapers and media outlets
List of African-American newspapers in Arkansas
List of African-American newspapers in Louisiana
List of African-American newspapers in New Mexico
List of African-American newspapers in Oklahoma
List of newspapers in Texas

Works cited

References

External links

Newspapers
Texas
African-American
African-American newspapers